Lieutenant General Allen Trio Paredes is a Filipino general who served as the incumbent Chief of the Air Force, replacing Lieutenant General Rozzano D. Briguez. Prior to his post, he served as the former commander of the Air Logistics Command and the 250th Presidential Airlift Wing.

Early life and education
He finished schooling at the Victoria School Foundation in Marikina in 1982 before attending the Philippine Military Academy (PMA) in 1984 and graduated as a member of the PMA's "Maringal" Class of 1988. He attended various courses locally and abroad, such as courses in the Armed Forces of the Philippines Command and General Staff College and earned his Masters in National Security Administration (MNSA) at the National Defense College of the Philippines (NDCP), Class 48. He underwent military pilot training at the Philippine Air Force School in Basilio Fernando Air Base in Lipa, Batangas after graduating and completed the training course in 1990.

Military career

After graduating from the PMA in 1988 and finishing his military pilot training in 1990. He started his junior days as a lieutenant as a seasoned attack pilot in the 18th Attack Squadron under the 15th Strike Wing flying the McDonnell Douglas MD 520MG Defender light attack helicopters, conducting air support operations in Mindanao.  Since then, he was primarily assigned on helicopters, logistics, research and development, maintenance, and safety missions and positions, where he served as the Assistant Chief of Staff for Logistics, OA-4; and became commander of the Air Force Research & Development Center, the 410th Maintenance Wing and the 420th Supply Wing, both headquartered at Clark Air Base in Pampanga. Paredes also served as commander of the 20th Attack Squadron of the 15th Strike Wing, utilizing the McDonnell Douglas MD 520MG Defenders as the squadron's 11th commander.

Paredes also served as the commander of the Tactical Operations Group 10, based in Cagayan de Oro. During his time as a colonel, he was also part of a special committee during the Death of Jesse Robredo in 2012, where he served as the Air Force representative during the investigation. He also served as Deputy Wing Commander of the 250th Presidential Airlift Wing and as the Director of Air Force Safety Office. He earned his first star and was promoted to brigadier general in 2016, as he commanded the 250th Presidential Airlift Wing, from February 2016 to July 2018.

He earned his second star and was promoted to major general in 2018, as he served as the Chief of the Air Force Staff, the third highest post in the PAF from July to December 2018, and served as commander of the Air Logistics Command in December 2018 to January 2020, where he command all logistical units of the Air Force, before being appointed as the new Chief of the Air Force on January 16, 2020, and earned his third star as a lieutenant general in March 2020. As the PAF Chief, he vowed to be a "father figure" of the air force during his tenure, and formulated a new leadership command framework: "Take the Lead, Soar as One", guided by the values of "Diwa, Galing, and Malasakit” (Responsiveness, Excellence and Devotion), and laid out the InSTEP (Integrity, Service, Team, Excellence, and Professionalism) initiative.  He also pushed for the PAF's modernization through the procurement of additional aircraft in the air force, such as 32 additional units of the Sikorsky S-70i helicopters, the TAI/AgustaWestland T129 ATAK attack helicopters, the C-130J Super Hercules, and the KAI KT-1 Woongbi. He also led the overall air force operations and assistance despite the effects of the COVID-19 pandemic in the country.

Awards in military service
Left Side:

Right Side:

Badges and Other Awards:
  National Defense College of the Philippines Badge
 AFP Logistics Eligibility Badge
 Philippine Air Force Flight Plan 2028 Badge

Personal life
He is the son of retired Brigadier General Raymundo Paredes. He is married to Jewel L. Paredes, and they have one daughter.

References

Philippine Air Force generals
Living people
1965 births